George H. Plowman (March 10, 1840 - February 27, 1921) was an American soldier who fought in the American Civil War. Plowman received his country's highest award for bravery during combat, the Medal of Honor. Plowman's medal was won for recapturing the colors of the 2d Pennsylvania Provisional Artillery during the Second Battle of Petersburg. He was honored with the award on December 1, 1864.

Plowman was born in Oxford, England. He served in the 16th West Virginia Infantry and the 9th Maryland Infantry before joining the 3rd Maryland Volunteer Infantry in February 1864. He was commissioned as an officer the following September, and mustered out in July 1865.

Medal of Honor citation

See also
List of American Civil War Medal of Honor recipients: M–P

References

1840 births
1921 deaths
American Civil War recipients of the Medal of Honor
19th-century English people
English-born Medal of Honor recipients
English emigrants to the United States
Burials at Arlington National Cemetery
People from Oxford
Union Army soldiers
United States Army Medal of Honor recipients